This is a list of electoral divisions and wards in the ceremonial county of Lincolnshire in the East Midlands. All changes since the re-organisation of local government following the passing of the Local Government Act 1972 are shown. The number of councillors elected for each electoral division or ward is shown in brackets.

County council

Lincolnshire
Electoral Divisions from 1 April 1974 (first election 12 April 1973) to 7 May 1981:

Electoral Divisions from 7 May 1981 to 7 June 2001:

Electoral Divisions from 7 June 2001 to 4 May 2017:

† minor boundary changes in 2009

Electoral Divisions from 4 May 2017 to present:

Unitary authority councils

North East Lincolnshire
Wards from 1 April 1996 (first election 4 May 1995) to 1 May 2003:

Wards from 1 May 2003 to present:

North Lincolnshire
Wards from 1 April 1996 (first election 4 May 1995) to 1 May 2003:

Wards from 1 May 2003 to present:

District councils

Boston
Wards from 1 April 1974 (first election 7 June 1973) to 3 May 1979:

Wards from 3 May 1979 to 6 May 1999:

Wards from 6 May 1999 to 7 May 2015:

Wards from 7 May 2015 to present:

East Lindsey
Wards from 1 April 1974 (first election 7 June 1973) to 5 May 1983:

Wards from 5 May 1983 to 6 May 1999:

Wards from 6 May 1999 to 7 May 2015:

Wards from 7 May 2015 to present:

Lincoln
Wards from 1 April 1974 (first election 7 June 1973) to 3 May 1979:

Wards from 3 May 1979 to 6 May 1999:

Wards from 6 May 1999 to 3 May 2007:

Wards from 3 May 2007 to 5 May 2016:

Wards from 5 May 2016 to present:

North Kesteven
Wards from 1 April 1974 (first election 7 June 1973) to 3 May 1979:

Wards from 3 May 1979 to 6 May 1999:

Wards from 6 May 1999 to 3 May 2007:

Wards from 3 May 2007 to present:

South Holland
Wards from 1 April 1974 (first election 7 June 1973) to 3 May 1979:

Wards from 3 May 1979 to 6 May 1999:

Wards from 6 May 1999 to 3 May 2007:

Wards from 3 May 2007 to present:

South Kesteven
Wards from 1 April 1974 (first election 7 June 1973) to 3 May 1979:

Wards from 3 May 1979 to 6 May 1999:

Wards from 6 May 1999 to 7 May 2015:

Wards from 7 May 2015 to present:

West Lindsey
Wards from 1 April 1974 (first election 7 June 1973) to 3 May 1979:

Wards from 3 May 1979 to 6 May 1999:

Wards from 6 May 1999 to 7 May 2015:

† minor boundary changes in 2008

Wards from 7 May 2015 to present:

Former county council

Humberside
Electoral Divisions from 1 April 1974 (first election 12 April 1973) to 7 May 1981:

Electoral Divisions from 7 May 1981 to 1 April 1996 (county abolished):

Former district councils

Boothferry
See: List of electoral wards in East Riding of Yorkshire#Boothferry

Cleethorpes
Wards from 1 April 1974 (first election 7 June 1973) to 3 May 1979:

Wards from 3 May 1979 to 1 April 1996 (district abolished):

Glanford
Wards from 1 April 1974 (first election 7 June 1973) to 3 May 1979:

Wards from 3 May 1979 to 1 April 1996 (district abolished):

Great Grimsby
Wards from 1 April 1974 (first election 7 June 1973) to 3 May 1979:

Wards from 3 May 1979 to 1 April 1996 (district abolished):

Scunthorpe
Wards from 1 April 1974 (first election 7 June 1973) to 3 May 1979:

Wards from 3 May 1979 to 1 April 1996 (district abolished):

Electoral wards by constituency

Brigg and Goole
Axholme Central, Axholme North, Axholme South, Brigg and Wolds, Broughton and Appleby, Burringham and Gunness, Burton upon Stather and Winterton, Goole North, Goole South, Snaith, Airmyn, Rawcliffe and Marshland.

Boston and Skegness
Burgh le Marsh, Central, Coastal, Croft, Fenside, Fishtoft, Five Village, Frampton and Holme, Frithville, Ingoldmells, Kirton, North, Old Leake and Wrangle, Pilgrim, St Clement's, Scarbrough, Seacroft, Sibsey, Skirbeck, South, Staniland North, Staniland South, Stickney, Swineshead and Holland Fen, Wainfleet and Friskney, West, Winthorpe, Witham, Wyberton.

Cleethorpes
Barton, Croft Baker, Ferry, Haverstoe, Humberston and New Waltham, Immingham, Sidney Sussex, Waltham, Wolds.

Gainsborough
Bardney, Caistor, Cherry Willingham, Dunholme, Fiskerton, Gainsborough East, Gainsborough North, Gainsborough South-West, Hemswell, Kelsey, Lea, Market Rasen, Middle Rasen, Nettleham, Saxilby, Scampton, Scotter, Stow, Sudbrooke, Thonock, Torksey, Waddingham and Spital, Welton, Wold View, Wragby, Yarborough.

Grantham and Stamford
All Saints, Aveland, Belmont, Bourne East, Bourne West, Earlesfield, Forest, Glen Eden, Grantham St John's, Green Hill, Greyfriars, Harrowby, Hillsides, Isaac Newton, Lincrest, Morkery, Ringstone, St Anne's, St George's, St Mary's, St Wulfram's, Stamford St John's, Thurlby, Toller, Truesdale.

Great Grimsby
East Marsh, Freshney, Heneage, Park, Scartho, South, West Marsh, Yarborough.

Lincoln
Abbey, Birchwood, Boultham, Bracebridge, Bracebridge Heath and Waddington East, Carholme, Castle, Glebe, Hartsholme, Minster, Moorland, Park, Skellingthorpe.

Louth and Horncastle
Alford, Binbrook, Chapel St Leonards, Coningsby and Tattershall, Grimoldby, Halton Holegate, Holton le Clay, Horncastle, Hundleby, Legbourne, Ludford, Mablethorpe Central, Mablethorpe East, Mablethorpe North, Mareham le Fen, Marshchapel, North Holme, North Somercotes, North Thoresby, Priory, Roughton, St James’, St Margaret's, St Mary's, St Michael's, Skidbrooke with Saltfleet Haven, Spilsby, Sutton on Sea North, Sutton on Sea South, Tetford, Tetney, Trinity, Trusthorpe and Mablethorpe South, Willoughby with Sloothby, Withern with Stain, Woodhall Spa.

Scunthorpe
Ashby, Bottesford, Brumby, Crosby and Park, Frodingham, Kingsway with Lincoln Gardens, Ridge, Town.

Sleaford and North Hykeham
Ashby de la Launde, Barrowby, Bassingham, Billinghay, Branston and Mere, Brant Broughton, Cliff Villages, Cranwell and Byard's Leap, Eagle and North Scarle, Ermine, Heath, Heckington Rural, Heighington and Washingborough, Kyme, Leasingham and Roxholm, Loveden, Martin, Metheringham, North Hykeham Forum, North Hykeham Memorial, North Hykeham Mill, North Hykeham Moor, North Hykeham Witham, Osbournby, Peascliffe, Ruskington, Saxonwell, Sleaford Castle, Sleaford Holdingham, Sleaford Mareham, Sleaford Navigation, Sleaford Quarrington, Sleaford Westholme, Waddington West, Witham Valley.

South Holland and The Deepings
Crowland, Deeping St James, Deeping St Nicholas, Donington, Fleet, Gedney, Gosberton Village, Holbeach Hurn, Holbeach St John's, Holbeach Town, Long Sutton, Market and West Deeping, Pinchbeck, Spalding Castle, Spalding Monks House, Spalding St John's, Spalding St Mary's, Spalding St Paul's, Spalding Wygate, Surfleet, Sutton Bridge, The Saints, Weston and Moulton, Whaplode.

See also
List of parliamentary constituencies in Lincolnshire

References

 
Lincolnshire